The Anschutz Entertainment Group (AEG), also known as AEG Worldwide, is an American global sporting and music entertainment presenter and a subsidiary of The Anschutz Corporation. It is the world's largest owner of sports teams and sports events. Under the AEG Presents brand, it is the world's second-largest presenter of live music and entertainment events, after Live Nation. AEG Presents was founded in 2002 as AEG Live.

Overview
AEG owns and operates a variety of venues, sport teams, and entertainment concerns. For venues, AEG owns and operates Crypto.com Arena and Dignity Health Sports Park, and managed the XL Center and Rentschler Field. In England, it operates The O2 which includes a 20,000 capacity arena. As part of the development of the O2, Anschutz also purchased the London river service company Thames Clippers, and supported the development of the nearby David Beckham Academy (which also had a branch at the Home Depot Center). The company had its headquarters in Downtown Los Angeles.

In sports teams, the company owns the Los Angeles Galaxy, 50% of the Los Angeles Kings, Ontario Reign, Eisbären Berlin with Berlin Mercedes-Benz Arena, 23.5% of Hammarby IF, as well as interests in the Los Angeles Lakers and Los Angeles Sparks. AEG also owns Hamburg Freezers before ceasing its existence in 2016. The company also purchased the Champions on Ice figure skating tour in 2006, and own 12% of Djurgårdens IF Hockey. The company makes a significant amount of its money by leveraging its sports interests, already significant earners, by using the stadiums in which these teams play to host various other entertainment events, most notably concerts. Philip Anschutz created the company by buying up several small local promoters in Los Angeles in order to fill up the schedule for his new sports venue, Staples Center. These included ConcertsWest and Goldenvoice, which had been founded by Gary Tovar, and promotes the annual Coachella Valley Music and Arts Festival. AEG was the second-largest event promoter in the United States.

AEG Presents, previously AEG Live, came to international public attention in 2009 when it acted as the promoter for Michael Jackson's This Is It concerts. Jackson died just three weeks before the series of 50 concerts were due to begin. Members of Jackson's family have said that they would like to see an investigation, in general, into the role of AEG Live in the final weeks of his life, and also, in particular, into the role of the personal advisers and representatives whom they believe the promoters put in place for him.

On September 18, 2012, The Anschutz Corporation announced its intent to sell Anschutz Entertainment Group and its holdings. The company has retained financial advisors Blackstone Advisory Partners to assist in AEG's sale process. There had been some concerns about the sale as AEG was instrumental in the development of Farmers Field, a planned football stadium in Downtown Los Angeles that was intended to attract an NFL team to the city. Approval to begin construction of Farmers Field in 2013 for a 2016 completion was in the process of being finalized at the time that AEG's sale was announced. In 2015, plans for Farmers Field were abandoned when then St. Louis Rams owner Stan Kroenke announced plans for a stadium of his own.

On October 14, 2011, Anschutz announced AEG is no longer for sale and that it is changing CEOs. Tim Leiweke (CEO since 1996) left the firm; John Skorjanec was named  VP of National Media Accounts with Dan Beckerman now heading AEG.

AEG's primary subsidiary AEG Facilities merged with its rival venue operator SMG in October 2019, forming ASM Global.

Acquisitions
December 2000: Concerts West, Los Angeles
March 2001: Goldenvoice, Los Angeles

Arenas
AEG owns the Crypto.com Arena in Los Angeles, Dignity Health Sports Park in Carson, the PlayStation Theater in New York, The O2 in London, the Mercedes-Benz Arena in Berlin, and the Barclaycard Arena in Hamburg. Meanwhile, AEG operates the T-Mobile Center in Kansas City, the Target Center in Minneapolis, Shrine Auditorium in Los Angeles, The Colosseum at Caesars Palace in Las Vegas, the Oakland–Alameda County Coliseum and Oakland Arena in Oakland, the Pechanga Arena in San Diego, PNC Stadium in Houston, and The Theatre at Grand Prairie, SNHU Arena in Manchester.

Anschutz's investment in the O2, through his company Anschutz Entertainment Group previously resulted in his involvement in controversy related to the possible influence of former British Deputy Prime Minister, John Prescott in the award of the "super casino" license by the British government. Anschutz knows Prescott personally, having had him as a guest for a two-night stay at Anschutz's ranch in 2005 and footing the bill for hospitality and gifts.

In January 2007, the "Super Casino" license was awarded to a group in Manchester, rather than to Blackpool or London. Anschutz spent £50m on the Manchester Arena and the winner of the casino licence is a close ally of Anschutz, Sol Kerzner.

In August 2007, AEG announced plans with Harrah's Entertainment to build a privately financed 20,000-seat arena in Paradise, Nevada on the Las Vegas Strip on Harrah's land located directly behind the Bally's Las Vegas and Paris Las Vegas resorts. The informal partnership was dissolved the following year.

In October 2011, it was announced an agreement with Sociedade Esportiva Palmeiras and WTorre for managing the Allianz Parque, one of the most modern multipurpose spaces in the world, located in São Paulo, Brazil. With construction starting in 2010, was completed in November 2014.

In September 2013, it was announced that AEG Facilities, a stand-alone affiliate of AEG, had signed a 15-year contract to operate Wembley Arena in London, UK.

AEG Live partnered with MGM Resorts International to build the T-Mobile Arena in Las Vegas, which opened in April 2016.

AEG Ogden, a joint venture with Australian investors, managed sports venues and convention centres in Australia and Asia, including the International Convention Centre Sydney, Lang Park and Sydney Super Dome.

Sports ventures

Soccer
Anschutz was one of the co-founders and one of the lead investors of Major League Soccer. In 1996, he became the investor/operator of the Colorado Rapids, his first MLS franchise. The Rapids were then a subsidiary of the Anschutz Corporation. In subsequent years, as Anschutz acquired additional sports teams, it led to the formation of a new division of the company whose focus was sports and entertainment, and thus AEG was born, with the Rapids and hockey's LA Kings as its original members.

Since 1996, AEG has held ownership in the Chicago Fire, San Jose Earthquakes, New York/New Jersey MetroStars, D.C. United and Houston Dynamo. Currently, AEG is the investor/operator of the Los Angeles Galaxy.

Anschutz was inducted into the National Soccer Hall of Fame in 2006. Also in 2006, Anschutz received the National Soccer Medal of Honor, one of four recipients to ever receive the award. In 2007, Anschutz and AEG played a vital role in bringing David Beckham to the United States. Beckham is now employed by Galaxy Media and played for Los Angeles Galaxy. In 2009, he joined USA Bid Committee Board of Directors who are preparing the US's application and campaign to bring the World Cup to the United States.

Between 2001 and 2019, AEG was the biggest external investor and minority shareholder of Swedish Allsvenskan club Hammarby IF. On 27 November 2019, it was announced that Zlatan Ibrahimović, widely regarded to be the greatest Swedish football player of all time, had acquired 23.5 percent of the outstanding shares in Hammarby, which meant that AEG reduced their stake by half.

Anschutz Entertainment Group were in a consortium with Tottenham Hotspur to demolish the London 2012 Olympic Stadium in Stratford and then to build a new 60,000 seater soccer stadium in its place and to renovate the Crystal Palace athletics stadium. However this proposal was rejected.

Ice hockey
AEG owns the NHL's Los Angeles Kings; the AHL's Ontario Reign; the ECHL's Cincinnati Cyclones (co-owned with Nederlander Entertainment); and the German ice hockey team Eisbären Berlin. AEG also formerly owned the Manchester Monarchs and an interest in the Reading Royals, both of the ECHL.

Golf

In July 2010, it was announced that Xanterra Parks & Resorts, Inc. had entered into an agreement to purchase the Kingsmill Resort near Williamsburg, Virginia. Xanterra, owned by Anschutz since 2008, has traditionally operated in national and state parks across the United States, especially in the Western regions, including Yellowstone National Park in Wyoming and Crater Lake National Park in Oregon. As of 2010, Xanterra was operating about three dozen hotels and lodges with more than 5,000 guest rooms combined, with over 8,000 employees.

It has also been reported that Anschutz is currently in negotiations to buy the Silverado Golf Resort in Napa, California.

Other
Anschutz Entertainment Group also owned the Tour of California bicycling race and the Bay to Breakers footrace.

The company also managed the T-Mobile Center in Kansas City, Missouri, and managed the XL Center in Hartford, Connecticut until 2013. They previously operated Rentschler Field in Hartford from 2007 to 2010, during which they held a stake in the now-defunct Hartford Colonials of the UFL.

In April 2016, AEG announced a partnership with esports company ESL; the next year the company also announced an investment in the North American esports organization, Immortals.

Film
When filmmakers made a movie about Red Adair in 1967, Anschutz struck a deal with Universal Pictures to permit filming real fire fighters extinguishing a real oil blaze on his land for a $100,000 fee. The footage was used in the 1968 John Wayne movie Hellfighters.

Anschutz Film Group (formerly Crusader Entertainment, now known as Bristol Bay Productions and Walden Media) produced the commercially successful Holes in 2003 and The Chronicles of Narnia: The Lion, the Witch, and the Wardrobe in 2005.

The company also played a significant role the 2009 documentary–concert film Michael Jackson's This Is It.

Ticketing

AEG partnered with Outbox Enterprises, a start up company, in which AEG is both an equity partner and a client, to develop AXS (pronounced "access"). AXS is a digital marketing platform for purchasing tickets for sports and entertainment events.

Controversies

Berlin
In Berlin, local groups started a boycott against the projected development Mediaspree, of which O2 World is a part, arguing that huge sections of public spaces were being lost to the private sector. Furthermore, the Anschutz company was criticized for bully-like behavior in regards to the changing of the outer parameters of the sports arena. A section of the nearby East Side Gallery, a leftover piece of the Berlin Wall now serving as an international memorial for peace and freedom, had to be removed to enable the view of
Anschutz's new arena, located on the (former) eastern side of the city Spree. AEG has since promised to financially support the preservation of the East Side Gallery.

Michael Jackson Memorial Service
AEG benefited from global interest in the death of Michael Jackson by hosting a public memorial service at Staples Center, a prominent music venue in Los Angeles and home of the Grammy Museum. The event included security and logistical support by the City of Los Angeles totaling $3.2 million. Despite the expense to the city, some economists estimated that the event generated $4 million for local hotels, restaurants, and other businesses. City Council members and local media have called for the cost of the memorial incurred by the city to be paid for by the Jackson family and/or AEG, instead of the city taxpayer. In June 2010, AEG agreed to pay the city of Los Angeles $1.3 million to offset some of the cost incurred by the city during the tribute event.

AEG was also accused of having attempted to profit from the death of Michael Jackson, who was due to perform at London's O2 Arena in 2009/2010. While refunds of the approximately 750,000 tickets (at £55–£75 each plus £9 booking fee per ticket) were made available to customers who requested them, the promoter offered to send out "souvenir" tickets if fans of the singer waived their right to the refund.

The company estimated that 40–50% of its customers would request the original tickets in lieu of the refund, which would save the company $40 million in refunds. That was in addition to future profits from any material that formed a part of the "This Is It" concerts, which AEG made its intellectual property in sponsoring the concerts themselves.

After Conrad Murray, the physician appointed by AEG to take care of Jackson during the run-up and throughout the "This Is It" concerts, was found guilty of involuntary manslaughter, Katherine Jackson, Michael's mother and legal guardian of his three children, filed a wrongful death suit against the promoter, seeking damages that were reported to be in excess of tens of billions of dollars. AEG filed a motion to have the case dismissed which was denied by a Los Angeles County judge who felt sufficient evidence was present for the progression to a jury trial. The trial began on April 2. Murray, who served jail time for the death of Jackson, indicated that if he was called as a witness, he would refuse to testify to avoid incriminating himself in the midst of his sentence appeal, as he had not previously testified under oath regarding Jackson's death. On October 2, 2013, AEG was found not liable in the death of Michael Jackson.

See also 
AXS TV
Regal Entertainment Group

References

External links
 Anschutz Entertainment Group Official Website
 AEG Presents Official Website

Entertainment companies based in California
Sports event promotion companies
Companies based in Los Angeles
Chicago Fire FC
Houston Dynamo FC
Houston Dynamo FC owners
LA Galaxy
 
Los Angeles Lakers
Los Angeles Sparks owners
New York Red Bulls
Ontario Reign
San Jose Earthquakes
Manchester Monarchs
Hartford Colonials
United Football League (2009–2012) owners
Major League Soccer owners